James Brau may refer to:

 James C. Brau (born 1969), American economist
 James E. Brau (born 1946), American physicist